Wójtowa is a village in the administrative district of Gmina Lipinki, within Gorlice County, Lesser Poland Voivodeship, in southern Poland.

The village has a population of 1,500.

References

Villages in Gorlice County

 {{ Pozdrawiam <3}}